Elections to Southwark Council were held in May 1994.  The whole council was up for election. Turnout was 36.5%.

Election result

|}

Ward results

Abbey

John Johnson was a sitting councillor for Chaucer ward

Alleyn

Barset

Bellenden

Bricklayers

Browning

Brunswick

Burgess

Josephine Clark was a sitting councillor for Alleyn ward

Cathedral

Chaucer

David Buxton was a sitting councillor for Dockyard ward

College

Stephen Charge was a sitting councillor for Ruskin ward

Consort

Hassan Vahib was a sitting councillor for Lyndhurst ward

Dockyard

Faraday

Friary

Sonya Murison was a sitting councillor for Chaucer ward

Liddle

Lyndhurst

Newington

Robert Wingfield was a sitting councillor for Friary ward

Riverside

Rotherhithe

Ruskin

Anna McGettigan was a sitting councillor for Chaucer ward

Rye

St Giles

The Lane

Waverley

Heather Kirby was a sitting councillor for College ward

By-Elections

The by-election was called following the resignation of Cllr. James R. Munday.

The by-election was called following the resignation of Cllr. Mike Lee.

The by-election was called following the resignation of Cllr. Elizabeth Denton.

The by-election was called following the resignation of Cllr. Sonya J. H. Murison.

The by-election was called following the resignation of Cllr. Svetlana Kirov.

The by-election was called following the resignation of Cllr. Robert A. Bayne.

The by-election was called following the resignation of Cllr. Paul Cheesman.

The by-election was called following the resignation of Cllr. Eyscene Sheilds.

References

Council elections in the London Borough of Southwark
1994 London Borough council elections
20th century in the London Borough of Southwark